Alessandro Sperduti (born 8 July 1987) is an Italian actor who has appeared in multiple television and film productions since the age of 11. In 2016, he was noted for his performance as Piero de' Medici in the Rai television series Medici: Masters of Florence.

Selected filmography

References

External links

Living people
1987 births
Italian male film actors
20th-century Italian male actors
21st-century Italian male actors
Italian male television actors
Male actors from Rome